The first season of the Dragon Ball Z anime series contains the Raditz and Vegeta arcs, which comprises the Saiyan  Saga, which adapts the 17th through the 21st volumes of the Dragon Ball manga series by Akira Toriyama. The series follows the adventures of Goku. The episodes deal with Goku as he learns about his Saiyan heritage and battles Raditz, Nappa, and Vegeta, three other Saiyans who want Goku to join them and help them destroy life on Earth.

The season initially ran from April 1989 until February 1990 in Japan on Fuji Television. The season was then licensed for a heavily edited dubbed broadcast by Funimation Entertainment. Their adaptation first ran in September 1996 through September 1997, primarily on FOX, UPN and WB affiliate stations in the United States and Canada. The 39 episodes were cut down to a mere 28. Their edited adaptation was syndicated to television by Saban Entertainment, and was released by Geneon Entertainment (then known as Pioneer) on VHS and DVD between 1997 and 1999. Eventually, Geneon Entertainment lost the distribution license to the first 67 episodes and Funimation began redubbing the series for an uncut broadcast. The unedited version was released on DVD in 2005, but later cancelled and Funimation eventually began releasing season box sets of Dragon Ball Z and they re-released their first season on February 6, 2007. In late 2013, the company released the first season box set on the Blu-ray Disc format. In June 2009, Funimation announced that they would be releasing Dragon Ball Z in a new seven volume set called the "Dragon Box". Based on the original series masters with frame-by-frame restoration, the first set was released November 10, 2009.

Two pieces of theme music were used throughout the season. The opening theme, "Cha-La Head-Cha-La", is performed by Hironobu Kageyama and the ending theme,  is performed by Manna. The theme for the original 1996–1997 English dub is "Rock the Dragon", performed by Jeremy Sweet. The uncut English redub from 2005 uses "Dragon Ball Z theme" by Dave Moran. The remastered season one boxset uses "Dragon Ball Z movie theme" by Mark Menza.



Development

English dub production
In 1996, Funimation began working on their first season of an English dub for Dragon Ball Z. The company had previously produced a dub of Dragon Ball'''s first 13 episodes and first movie during 1995, but when plans for a second season were cancelled due to lower than expected ratings, they partnered with Saban Entertainment (known at the time for shows such as Mighty Morphin Power Rangers and X-Men) to distribute their adaptation to Fox, UPN and The WB affiliate stations. While Saban had a history of acquiring the rights to various anime series to be dubbed, Funimation still controlled the American license to the property during this period.  

The program would air during early morning time slots in most markets. It was part of the "Saban Network for Kids", a 1996–97 syndicated programming block which included other Saban anime dubs, such as Eagle Riders and Samurai Pizza Cats,Indiana Gazette, Apr 27, 1997, p. 53 as well as Masked Rider, Saban's Adventures of Oliver Twist and The Why Why Family. Heightened exposure from Saban helped ensure a larger audience for the series, which led to Funimation creating a second syndicated dub season in 1997, intended to air in its own hour long block. 

Like the prior Dragon Ball'' dub from 1995, this production used Canadian voice actors from Vancouver, British Columbia. However, this time ADR work was handled by The Ocean Group (now known as Ocean Productions), leading to fans referring to this dub as "the Ocean dub". Funimation also outsourced the role of music to ex-Saban musician Ron Wasserman, who was allowed to compose the background score from his home in Los Angeles, California. The theme song "Main Title" (known by fans as "Rock the Dragon") was created by Saban Entertainment, with the vocals performed by Jeremy Sweet. 

In 2004–2005, Funimation redubbed these episodes, now with their then-current American voice actors from Dallas, Texas. Unlike the 1996–1997 Ocean/Saban co-production, this dub had no episodes or scenes cut out, and no visual censorship; and while the script was still not based on a translation, they did rewrite it, and even threw in curse words. It featured a new background score by Dallas-based composer Nathan M. Johnson.

Episodes

Notes
 The episode "Escape from Piccolo" was scheduled to premiere in syndication on November 9, 1996, but was pulled by Saban, due to questionable content. The dub of this episode instead debuted on VHS ten months later in October 1997, when the second season was airing in syndication. It later premiered on television in September 1998 via Cartoon Network's Toonami block.
 The 1997 dub episodes "A New Goal... Namek" and "Journey to Namek" were produced as part of Funimation and Saban's second broadcast season of the show, and premiered in the fall of 1997, four months after the previous episode "The Battle Ends."

References

1989 Japanese television seasons
1990 Japanese television seasons
1996 American television seasons
1997 American television seasons
Z (season 1)